The 1910–11 season was the 38th season of competitive football in Scotland and the 21st season of the Scottish Football League.

Scottish League Division One

Champions: Rangers

Scottish League Division Two 

This season Ayr and Ayr Parkhouse have merged to form Ayr United. The vacant place in Division Two was filled by Dundee Hibernian.

Scottish Cup

Other honours

National

County

. *replay

Highland League

Junior Cup

Scotland national team

Key:
 (H) = Home match
 (A) = Away match
 BHC = British Home Championship

See also
1910–11 Aberdeen F.C. season

Notes and references

External links
Scottish Football Historical Archive

 
Seasons in Scottish football